KRI Cakra (401) is the lead vessel of the two-member  of diesel-electric attack submarines operated by the Indonesian Navy.

Name 
The vessel is named after the Cakra, a weapon in the form of a wheel with teeth resembling spearheads that was owned by  Batara Wisnu, a recurring character in wayang puppet theatre.

Construction 
KRI Cakra was ordered on 2 April 1977, laid down on 25 November 1977 and completed on 18 March 1981. The vessel was designed by Ingenieurkontor Lübeck of Lübeck, constructed by Howaldtswerke-Deutsche Werft of Kiel, and sold by Ferrostaal of Essen – all acting together as a West German consortium.

Operational history 

Both Cakra-class vessels underwent major refits at HDW spanning three years from 1986 to 1989. Cakra was refitted again at Surabaya from 1993 to  April 1997, including replacement batteries and updated Sinbad TFCS.

Cakra began another refit at Daewoo Shipyard, South Korea in 2004. It was completed in 2005. Work is reported to have included new batteries, overhaul of engines and modernisation of the combat system.

See also
 List of active Indonesian Navy ships

References

External links 

1980 ships
Cakra-class submarines
Submarines of Indonesia
Ships built in Kiel